Off the Beatle Track is a 1964 album by George Martin & His Orchestra, released 10 July by United Artists Records in the United States and 3 August by Parlophone in the United Kingdom.

It is the first of a series of albums by Martin featuring instrumental arrangements of songs by The Beatles, for whom he served as producer, arranger, and occasional accompanying musician. It is also the first LP Martin released under his own name. This album was later issued on CD by One Way Records. Later that same year, four of these recordings were reused for the album By Popular Demand, A Hard Day's Night.

Despite its "Beatles" association (the liner notes are even written by John Lennon) and being released at the height of Beatlemania in both the UK and USA, the album did not sell in large quantities. As a result, it is now a collectors item, with copies selling for in excess of £100.

Track listing
Tracks 1, 3, 6 and 8 are included on Martin's soundtrack album By Popular Demand, A Hard Day's Night.

References

1964 albums
Albums arranged by George Martin
Albums conducted by George Martin
Albums produced by George Martin
The Beatles tribute albums
George Martin albums
Parlophone albums
United Artists Records albums